Saint-Romain is a municipality in Quebec, in the regional county municipality of Le Granit in the administrative region of Estrie. The municipality is named after Pope Romanus, who was pope from August to November 1897.

References

External links

Municipalities in Quebec
Incorporated places in Estrie
Le Granit Regional County Municipality
Canada geography articles needing translation from French Wikipedia